Lee Yeon-hee (born January 9, 1988) is a South Korean actress. She is most known for her work in the television series East of Eden (2008), Phantom (2012),  Miss Korea (2013), The Package (2017); and in the films A Millionaire's First Love (2006), M (2007) and Detective K: Secret of the Lost Island (2015).

Early life 
Lee was born on January 9, 1988, in South Korea. In 2002, Lee successfully signed a contract with SM after she won the category of "Best Feature" in the SM Entertainment Best Youth contest. For the contest, she acted out a monologue, singing to Dana "Until the End of the World" and also did freestyle modeling poses. After she joined the company, she began intense training lessons on acting, singing, and dancing.

Career

2002–2006: Beginnings
Soon after she joined SM, Lee began her career by starring in music videos for SM artists, such as boy band TVXQ, Moon Hee-jun, Kangta, Shinhwa, and Fly to the Sky, overtaking SM artists Kim Bomi (of M.I.L.K.) and Lee Jiyeon (commonly known as CSJH The Grace's Lina) as "The SM music video girl".

Though Lee had relatively steady work between modelling in magazines, commercial ads and appearing in music videos, she did not officially debut until late 2004. In November 2004, she starred as the younger version of the main character in the hit historical drama Emperor of the Sea, and appeared in the latter episodes of the daily drama My Lovely Family. Lee had her first major role in television in MBC's mini-series One Fine Day (2006).

2007–2012: Rising popularity & acting criticism
In 2007, Lee starred in romance melodrama A Millionaire's First Love alongside Hyun Bin. She also made her singing debut for the film, singing "Do-Re-Mi" from The Sound of Music and Insa for the film's original soundtrack. Lee's innocent image in the film earned her the title of "Nation's First Love" in Korea. Lee followed this with moderately successful film, M alongside Kang Dong-won; and starred alongside So Ji-sub in the short film, U-Turn.

In 2008, she starred as one of the main cast in 47th MBC Anniversary Project East of Eden. Despite the drama's success, her acting in the series received overwhelming negative criticism about her vocalization, unexpressive facial expressions, and unnatural emotional expression as problems in portraying her character. Lee returned to film, starring in Hello, Schoolgirl opposite Yoo Ji-tae. The story is based on the manhwa Soonjeong Manhwa by Kang Pool.

In 2011, Lee starred opposite Jang Dong-gun, Joe Odagiri and Fan Bing-bing in Kang Je-gyu's big budget historical film My Way, and in romance comedy series Paradise Ranch by S.M. Entertainment alongside label-mate Shim Chang-min of boy band TVXQ. In 2012, Lee reunited with U-Turn co-star So Ji-sub in the crime thriller Phantom.  Both Lee and So were named promotional ambassadors for cyber crime prevention by the National Police Agency in 2012.

2013–present: Career resurgence and continued success
In 2013, Lee made a special appearance in the historical drama Gu Family Book, where she received compliments for her improvement in acting.  She next starred in romantic comedy film Marriage Blue, which tells the story of an engaged couple who experience last-minute jitters and cold feet just a week before their wedding ceremony. Lee closed the year with television series Miss Korea to positive reviews, with many considering her role as her best performance to date.

Lee further challenged herself with a provocative role as the mysterious and seductive Japanese geisha Hisako in the historical comedy Detective K: Secret of the Lost Island in 2015. She then starred in MBC's 54th anniversary drama, Splendid Politics.

In 2017, Lee starred in SBS's fantasy romance drama Reunited Worlds alongside Yeo Jin-goo. She then starred in JYP Entertainment's travel romance drama The Package opposite Jung Yong-hwa, and was complimented for her performance as a tour guide.

In 2020, Lee starred in mystery drama The Game: Towards Zero, reuniting with Ok Taec-yeon with whom she starred in the 2013 film Marriage Blue. However she was criticized for her bad acting skills by viewers.

In 2020, Lee signed a contract with VAST Entertainment after her contract with SM expired.

Personal life 
On June 2, 2020, Lee married her non-celebrity boyfriend in a private ceremony.

Filmography

Film

Television series

Web series

Television shows

Music video appearances

Theater

Discography

Awards and nominations

References

External links 
 
 
 

1988 births
Living people
South Korean child actresses
South Korean film actresses
South Korean television actresses